Minsk Half Marathon is an annual road running event over the half marathon distance which is held in September on the streets of Minsk, Belarus. The competition comprises three main parts: a 21.0975 km half marathon race, a 10,55 km race, and a 5,5 km race.

In 2015 the running event was organized with financial support from Volkswagen Polo. It was called 'Minsk Polo Marathon'. In 2015 the number of participants reached 16 099 people from 36 countries.

List of winners 
Key:

References

External links 
 
 2018 Results
 2017 Results
 2016 Results
 2015 Results

Half marathons
Sports competitions in Minsk
Autumn events in Belarus